The Fo Guang Shan Temple of Auckland is a temple and community centre of the Fo Guang Shan Chinese Buddhist movement in the East Tāmaki/Flat Bush suburb of Auckland, New Zealand. The temple and complex were built over seven years. It was designed in the architectural style of the Tang Dynasty. The temple also includes a large Buddha statue and a two-tonne bell.

Opened in late 2007, the mission of the new temple is to promote Humanistic Buddhism. But it is also intended to benefit (and is open to) non-Buddhists, "through education and teaching people how to lead good lives." Even before its official opening, the temple had provided community courses such as Chinese calligraphy, Chinese language, yoga and martial arts, as well as providing a venue for crime prevention talks and meetings.

Facilities 
The temple grounds are open six days a week (closed Monday) and are open on most public holidays. Hours are normally 9 am until 5 pm but some parts of the temple (notably the exhibition hall and the external shrine) may open later and close earlier. During festivals, the temple may be open later in the evening and occasionally will be open past midnight such as on the Lunar New Year.

Main Buddha hall 
The main Buddha hall contains a single large Chinese-style statue of the Buddha Gautama in Calling the Earth to Witness pose. On the walls are thousands of bas-relief Buddha images.

Exhibition hall/Art gallery 
Adjacent to the Buddha Hall is an exhibition hall. Exhibits are often, though not always, works of art about Buddhism, such as paintings, calligraphy and woven art. Several exhibits are shown throughout the year with each exhibit lasting for a few months but sometimes there are special exhibitions of a shorter duration. Occasionally, there will be activities for children, such as calligraphy writing during a calligraphy exhibition.

Exhibitions by local artists are also held, such as the late 2019 - early 2020 exhibition by Dean Buchanan inspired by bicycling through the Waitākere Ranges.

The exhibition hall is open slightly shorter hours than the rest of the temple grounds. (As of 2022, the hall is open from 10 am to 2 pm, while the rest of temple is open from 9 am to 3 pm.) Entry is free.

Other areas 
The entrance hall contains a statue of Avalokitesvara. A desk to the left is manned by a volunteer member of Buddha's Light International Association (BLIA) and/or a resident nun to assist visitors and worshippers.

Outside and to the left of the main temple structure and below ground is a shrine to Ksitigarbha. This shrine shuts earlier than the rest of the temple.

The central area of the courtyard is divided into large flagstones separated by a grid of several inch high plants which lends itself to a slow walking meditation practice. (There is clear space to either side as well as level pathways for those with mobility concerns.)

To one side of the central courtyard is a series of short raised wood paths amongst cherry and other trees that lends itself to fast-walking meditation practice.

Other rooms off the central courtyard are often used for various services and activities such as language and calligraphy, sutra-chanting, and study groups.

A substantial area of the property is given over to car-parking. During larger festivals (notably Chinese New Year) portions of the front grounds will be covered with various food and activity stalls.

Water Drop Teahouse 
On site is a tea house providing vegetarian food and a variety of teas or tizanes.

Gift shop 
Sharing the same room as the tea house is a small gift shop providing a number of works of literature about Buddhism, particularly the writings of Hsing Yun (Fo Guang Shan's founder), a variety of religious objects (such as statues, mala, icons) and similar.

See also
 IBPS Manila
 Zu Lai Temple
 Nan Hua Temple
 Hsi Lai Temple
 Chung Tian Temple
 Fo Guang Shan Buddha Museum

References

External links
Fo Guang Shan New Zealand (North Island) (official website)

Asian-New Zealand culture in Auckland
Chinese-New Zealand culture
Religious buildings and structures in Auckland
Buddhism in New Zealand
Fo Guang Shan temples
2000s architecture in New Zealand